George Kolala (born 3 March 1976) is a Zambian retired football goalkeeper. He was a squad member for the 2006 Africa Cup of Nations.

References

1976 births
Living people
Zambian footballers
Zambia international footballers
Zamsure F.C. players
Zanaco F.C. players
Association football goalkeepers
2006 Africa Cup of Nations players